YIYNOVA (zh. 钰奇科技有限公司 Yu Qi Technology Co., Ltd.) is a Taiwanese technology company specializing in graphics tablets and embedded LCD tablets, founded in 2008 and headquartered in Taipei, Taiwan, with additional offices in Hong Kong and Shenzhen, China.

History and activity 
Shenzhen Zhongzhi kay Technology Co., Ltd. is YIYNOVA (Yu Qi Technology) was founded in mainland China with technology research and product development-oriented high-tech enterprises. The company developed the handwriting display, handwritten one computer, and handwriting tablet computers Tablet products, using pressure sensitive electromagnetic pen interactive technology to achieve the world's advanced level, including handwritten computer products in the "2010 Shenzhen Optoelectronic Display Week" and the "Shenzhen (International) TV Festival "exhibition received the 2009 China photoelectric display industry Product Excellence Award of the" Innovation Design Award. " Company R & D team is the first group engaged in electromagnetic handwriting technology development staff, also has eight years of experience in developing and manufacturing LCD backlight, as well as 14 years of experience in product development and manufacturing displays. In addition the company is also one of the important LCD TV products, and selected Chinese Journal of Quality and Technical Supervision in 2010, "3.15" branding of the "national product quality and stability of qualified enterprises."

Lee Yi Wang Trade (Shenzhen) Co., Ltd. is engaged in business in the mainland-based enterprises YIYNOVA established. Meanwhile, YIYNOVA also has offices in Hong Kong.
YIYNOVA full advantage of Taiwan's IT industry, advanced technology, the advantages of Hong Kong's international business hub, as well as the most sophisticated information industry chain resources Shenzhen that China, based on the mainland for the world, providing high-quality, high efficiency, product development, manufacturing and marketing services . The company four series of products have been exported to countries and regions.

See also 
 Graphics tablet
 Embedded LCD tablets

References 

  Company Profile
 Regional distributors

Electronics companies of China
Display technology companies
Companies based in Taipei
Taiwanese companies established in 2008
Chinese brands
Electronics companies of Taiwan